Krutovsky is a rural locality (a khutor) and the administrative center of Krutovskoye Rural Settlement, Serafimovichsky District, Volgograd Oblast, Russia. The population was 521 as of 2010. There are 14 streets.

Geography 
Krutovsky is located 51 km west of Serafimovich (the district's administrative centre) by road. Yelansky is the nearest rural locality.

References 

Rural localities in Serafimovichsky District